KCVH-LD, virtual and VHF digital channel 6, is a low-powered religious television station licensed to Houston, Texas, United States. The station is owned by Daij Media. KCVH-LD's transmitter is located near Missouri City, Texas, in unincorporated northeastern Fort Bend County.

History

It was formerly the flagship station for LAT TV, a Spanish-language network owned by Latin America Broadcasting. KCVH-LP was a charter station for the network, which launched in May 2006. In May 2008, LAT TV ceased broadcasting, and KCVH suspended operations on June 23, 2008.

In July 2009, the station was sold to Daij Media LLC. The station briefly returned to the air in February 2010 in analog as "Aleluya TV". An application to switch to digital broadcasting was granted by the FCC on February 25, 2010, the digital signal went on the air December 15, 2010, and religious programming began airing January 31, 2011.

References 

CVH-LD
Television channels and stations established in 1988
1988 establishments in Texas
Low-power television stations in the United States